Georges Périnal (1897 Paris– 23 April 1965 London) was a French cinematographer. He is best known for his works with Jean Grémillon, René Clair, Jean Cocteau, Michael Powell, Charlie Chaplin, Otto Preminger.

Partial filmography 
 Six et demi, onze (1927)
 Misdeal (1928)
 The Lighthouse Keepers (1929)
 Les Nouveaux Messieurs (1929)
 The Ladies in the Green Hats (1929)
 Le Sang d'un poète (1930)
 Sous les toits de Paris (1930)
 À nous la liberté (1931)
 The Perfume of the Lady in Black (1931)
 The Private Life of Henry VIII (1933)
 Catherine the Great (1934)
 The Private Life of Don Juan (1934)
 Sanders of the River (1935)
 Rembrandt (1936)
 The Drum (1938)
 The Four Feathers (1939, nominated for the 1939 Academy Award for Best Cinematography)
 The Thief of Bagdad (1940, winner of the 1940 Academy Award for Best Cinematography)
 Dangerous Moonlight (1941)
 The First of the Few (1942)
 The Life and Death of Colonel Blimp (1943)
 Perfect Strangers (1945)
 An Ideal Husband (1947)
 A Man About the House (1947)
 The Fallen Idol (1948)
 The Mudlark (1950)
 My Daughter Joy (1950)
 No Highway in the Sky (1951)
 Three Cases of Murder (1955)
 Loser Takes All (film) (1956)
 A King in New York (1957)
 Bonjour Tristesse (1958)
 Tom Thumb (1958)
 Oscar Wilde (1960)
 Once More, with Feeling!'' (1960)

References

External links 
 

1897 births
1965 deaths
Cinematographers from Paris
Best Cinematographer Academy Award winners